Waldemar Verner (27 August 1914 in Chemnitz, Germany – 15 February 1982) was chief of the People's Navy (Volksmarine) of the National People's Army of the German Democratic Republic and brother of Paul Verner.

The son of a metalworker he trained as a window decorator. In 1923, Verner joined the Communist Young Spartacus organization and Communist Youth Federation of Germany (KJVD) in 1929. He became a member of the Communist Party of Germany (KPD) in 1930. Verner was arrested and imprisoned by the Nazis because of their accusing him of illegal activities in the KPD, and he went into exile in the Soviet Union. There he attended the VI World Congress of the Communist Youth International in 1935 and later the International Lenin School.  Starting in 1938, Verner was operating for the KPD in Denmark.

He returned to Germany at the end of 1945.  After the founding of the SED in 1946 he served as acting District Chairman in Hagenow.

In May 1947, at the suggestion the National Board of the SED and the District Board of Mecklenburg-Vorpommern in the Stralsund he was appointed as the District Chairman replacing Ernst Guth.  In September 1947 he served as a delegate at the 2nd Congress of the SED, and in December 1947 at the 1st German People's Congress in Berlin.

Verner ran for the election to the 3rd German People's Congress in May 1949 against Paul Sack (FDGB), Kurt Krönng (LDPD) und Hartwig Stender (CDU) and was elected by 74.9% of the votes cast in the Stralsund election district.

Verner's career as a naval officer began on 15 June 1950. He served as the Inspector General of the Main Administration Sea Police until 1952. From 1952 to 1955, Verner held the office of the Chief of the People's Police-Sea located in Stralsund with the rank of Vizeadmiral (since 1 October 1952). From 1955 to 1956, he studied at the Soviet Naval Academy.

From 1957 to 1959 Verner was Chief of the East German Navy (Seestreitkräfte). He was then appointed as Deputy Minister of National Defense of the German Democratic Republic and the head of the political headquarters of the National People's Army. He served in these positions until his retirement from active service on 31 December 1978. On 1 March 1961 he became the first officer to the People's Navy to be promoted to admiral.

On 8 May 1980 the city of Stralsund honored him in appreciation of his contribution to the development of the city.  This honor was withdrawn after the reunification of Germany.

References
 Klaus Froh, Rüdiger Wenzke: Die Generale und Admirale der NVA. Ein biographisches Handbuch. 4. Auflage. Ch. Links, Berlin 2000,

External links
 Wer war wer in der DDR?

1914 births
1982 deaths
People from Chemnitz
People from the Kingdom of Saxony
Communist Party of Germany politicians
Members of the Central Committee of the Socialist Unity Party of Germany
Admirals of the Volksmarine
Refugees from Nazi Germany in the Soviet Union
International Lenin School alumni
Members of the 8th Volkskammer
Recipients of the Patriotic Order of Merit (honor clasp)
Recipients of the Banner of Labor
N. G. Kuznetsov Naval Academy alumni